Jeffrey Maier (born 1983) is an American baseball fan who received media attention for an incident in which he was involved as a 12-year-old at a baseball game. During Game 1 of the 1996 American League Championship Series between the New York Yankees and the Baltimore Orioles, Maier deflected a batted ball, hit by Derek Jeter, into the Yankee Stadium stands for what umpires ruled to be a home run, rather than fan interference. His interference altered the course of Game 1, as the resulting home run allowed the Yankees to tie the score. They emerged victorious from the game and won the series four games to one en route to winning the World Series.

Incident

On October 9, 1996, the Yankees trailed the Orioles 4–3 in the bottom of the eighth inning when shortstop Derek Jeter hit a deep fly ball to right field. Right fielder Tony Tarasco moved near the fence and appeared "to draw a bead on the ball" when the then-12-year-old Maier clearly reached over the fence separating the stands and the field of play nine feet below and snatched the ball with his glove. While baseball fans are permitted to catch (and keep) balls hit into the stands, the Major League Baseball rulebook states that spectator interference is to be called if "a spectator reaches out of the stands, or goes on the playing field, and touches a live ball".

Right field umpire Rich Garcia immediately ruled the play a home run, tying the game at 4–4, despite the protest of Tarasco and Orioles manager Davey Johnson (the latter was ejected in the ensuing argument).

The Yankees won the game in the eleventh inning on Bernie Williams' walk-off home run. The Orioles maintained their protest of the Maier play after the conclusion of the game, but their protest was denied by American League President Gene Budig because judgment calls cannot be protested. After viewing the replay, Garcia admitted that there was spectator interference, and he maintained the ball was catchable. Had Garcia called spectator interference, he would have then used his own judgment to determine what the most likely outcome of the play would beeither an out or awarding Jeter a given number of bases.

The Yankees went on to win the series against Baltimore, four games to one, as well as the World Series against the Atlanta Braves. As a result of the play, a railing was added behind the right field wall at Yankee Stadium to prevent fans from reaching over it.

Meanwhile, in New York, Maier became a minor celebrity. The New York Daily News allowed him to sit behind the Yankee dugout later in the postseason. The boy appeared on national talk shows.

Baseball career
Maier grew up in Old Tappan, New Jersey, and played baseball there at Northern Valley Regional High School at Old Tappan. He then played college ball at Wesleyan University in Middletown, Connecticut, where he was a first-team all-NESCAC selection. He also played briefly for the Pittsfield Dukes in the New England Collegiate Baseball League in the summer of 2005.

In 2006, he became Wesleyan's career hits leader and was featured on ESPN. The New York Times reported that Maier hoped for a career in baseball. That spring, The Washington Post and MLB.com reported that, ironically, the Baltimore Orioles might draft himthough the team denied ever having an interest in him.  Maier was also invited to a try out for the New York Yankees. However, he was not selected by any team in the 2006 Major League Baseball Draft. He bats left-handed and throws right-handed.

Maier worked in the summer of 2006 as a scout in the Cape Cod League for ESPN's Peter Gammons and also as an instructor for Frozen Ropes Baseball Training Center. Maier later became a special consultant for the New Haven County Cutters and had several internships, including with the YES Network. In addition, he served as an extra and assisted with baseball skills training for the actors in ESPN's miniseries about the 1977 Yankees, The Bronx Is Burning.

Personal life
Maier is married with three sons and lives in New England.

See also

 Steve Bartman – fan involved in a similar interference incident at the wall

References

Further reading
  This chapter in Ruttman's history, based on a February 14, 2008 interview with Maier conducted for the book, discusses Maier's American, Jewish, baseball, and life experiences from youth to the present.

External links
 Video of the October 9, 1996 incident

1984 births
Living people
1996 Major League Baseball season
Baltimore Orioles postseason
Major League Baseball controversies
Place of birth missing (living people)
New York Yankees postseason
Northern Valley Regional High School at Old Tappan alumni
People from Old Tappan, New Jersey
Baseball spectators
Wesleyan Cardinals baseball players